Rox is an extinct town in Lincoln County, in the U.S. state of Nevada.

History
The first settlement at Rox was made about 1902. A post office was established at Rox in 1921, and remained in operation until 1949. The community was named from the rocky condition of the original town site.

References

Ghost towns in Lincoln County, Nevada